Justin James Fuente (born July 30, 1976) is a former American football coach and player. He was the head football coach at Virginia Tech from 2016 to 2021. He was the 2016 ACC Coach of the Year. Fuente was the head football coach at the University of Memphis from 2012 to 2015. He was an assistant at Texas Christian University from 2007 to 2011 and previously at Illinois State University from 2001 to 2006. Fuente attended the University of Oklahoma before transferring to Murray State University after his redshirt sophomore season. He played quarterback for both schools. Fuente played a single season with the Oklahoma Wranglers of the Arena Football League.

Fuente has coached quarterbacks as an assistant or head coach including three-time Pro Bowler Andy Dalton, first-round draft pick Paxton Lynch, and arena football quarterback Jerod Evans.

Early life
Fuente was born in Tulsa, Oklahoma. Justin married his wife Jenny in 2005 and they have three daughters. Fuente and his family are Catholic.

Playing career

High school
Fuente attended Union High School in Tulsa and played football as a quarterback, where he threw for 6,104 yards and 65 touchdowns. In 1994, his senior season he led the state in both passing yards (2,934) and touchdown passes (32). Statewide recognition followed, with the Tulsa World naming him "Player of the Year" and The Oklahoman "All-State Offensive Player of the Year.". Several schools recruited Fuente, including Oklahoma, Oklahoma State, Tulsa and Texas A&M, but he ultimately signed with Oklahoma under coach Howard Schnellenberger in February 1995.

College
Fuente redshirted at Oklahoma for the 1995 season behind Eric Moore at quarterback. Following the season, Schnellenberger resigned as head coach and John Blake replaced him. Entering the 1996 season, Fuente backed up Moore. However, after Oklahoma opened the season with a loss to TCU, Blake named Fuente the starting quarterback. Fuente started the next eight games and compiled a 3–5 record before losing his starting position to Moore following the victory over Oklahoma State. For the year, Fuente completed 91 of 196 passes for 1,271 yards with ten interceptions and eight touchdowns. Fuente entered the 1997 season as the starting quarterback, but started only five games, winning two and losing three. Following the season, he transferred to Division I-AA Murray State University where he would be able to compete in the 1998 season. Fuente amassed 2,289 yards with the Sooners.

At Murray State, Fuente was named the Ohio Valley Conference Offensive Player of the Year and a finalist for the Walter Payton Award following the 1999 season. He still holds several single-season records at Murray State for a quarterback including: most pass completions (240), highest pass efficiency (151.21), most passing yards (3,497), and most touchdown passes (27). Following his graduation from Murray, Fuente signed a contract with the Oklahoma Wranglers of the Arena Football League.

Professional
In May 2000, Fuente signed a contract with the Wranglers as their third-string quarterback. After seeing limited action, in the 2000 season and into the 2001 season, Fuente left the team in May 2001 in order to pursue a college coaching position at Illinois State University.

Coaching career
Following his playing career, Fuente began his coaching career as the quarterbacks coach at Illinois State University in 2001. There he worked under Denver Johnson, who he played for when Johnson was an assistant coach at Oklahoma and as head coach at Murray State. After three years, Fuente was promoted to offensive coordinator, and he served in that position through the end of 2006 season when he accepted the running backs coach position at TCU. At TCU, he was promoted to co-offensive coordinator in 2009, and under his guidance both helped develop Andy Dalton at quarterback and lead the Horned Frogs to an undefeated season and victory in the 2011 Rose Bowl.

Memphis
The University of Memphis named Fuente its head coach on December 8, 2011, replacing Larry Porter. After the Tigers opened the 2012 season with only one win over their first nine games, Fuente led Memphis on a three-game winning streak to close the season and finish with an overall record of four wins and eight losses (4–8). In February 2013, Memphis extended the term of Fuente's contract through the 2017 season as a result of the gains he made in his first year as head coach of the Tigers.

Fuente's 2014 team captured a share of the American Athletic Conference championship, compiling a 7–1 conference record and 9–3 overall regular season record.  This was the Tigers' first conference championship since winning the Missouri Valley Conference in 1971. The team defeated BYU in the 2014 Miami Beach Bowl in double overtime, giving Fuente his first 10-win season and the Tigers' first 10-win season since 1938. The Tigers finished the season ranked  25 in both the AP and the Coaches Polls. Fuente was named a finalist for the Eddie Robinson Coach of the Year award. Fuente's contract was extended and he received a raise at the close of the 2014 season for a total of a 5-year deal at approximately $1.4 million per year.

Virginia Tech

Virginia Tech named Fuente its head coach on November 29, 2015, replacing the retiring Frank Beamer. In his first season in Blacksburg, Fuente led the Hokies to a 9-3 regular season record and a trip to the ACC Championship, representing the Coastal division. Fuente won the 2016 ACC Coach of the Year following the regular season. The Hokies defeated the Arkansas Razorbacks 35-24 in the 2016  Belk Bowl, overturning a  24-0 deficit at halftime and winning three consecutive bowl games for the first time in the program's history. Virginia Tech finished the season ranked #16 in both the AP and Coaches Poll. On April 3, 2017, Fuente and Virginia Tech agreed to a contract extension through 2023.  In 2020, during the COVID-19 pandemic college football season, Fuente's Hokies failed to qualify for a bowl, snapping the program's 29-year streak of bowl games, the longest such in the country at the time. Virginia Tech and Fuente agreed to mutually part ways with two games remaining in the 2021 season after bad losses to Boston College, Syracuse, Notre Dame, and Pittsburgh.

Head coaching record

References

External links

 Virginia Tech profile
 

1976 births
Living people
American football quarterbacks
Illinois State Redbirds football coaches
Memphis Tigers football coaches
Murray State Racers football players
Oklahoma Sooners football players
Oklahoma Wranglers players
TCU Horned Frogs football coaches
Virginia Tech Hokies football coaches
Sportspeople from Tulsa, Oklahoma
Coaches of American football from Oklahoma
Players of American football from Oklahoma